Penicillium sylvaticum is a species of fungus in the genus Penicillium.

References

sylvaticum
Fungi described in 1902